Myztiko "El de las melodías locas",  is a music producer. He is credited for producing various reggaeton albums and hits. He has worked with artists like R.K.M. & Ken-Y, Zion y Lennox, Daddy Yankee, Cruzito, Arcángel, Randy, Natti Natasha, Don Omar, Erre XI, Nicky Jam, Tony Dize y Farina.

Chart performance

Singles

Productions

Instrumental albums 

 2020: Untitled Beat Tape, Vol. 1

Studio albums 

 2003: Laboratorio Musikal
 2018: Dédicace
 2019: Música de Fondo
 2020: Los Phenomenons

Singles 

2001: Aqui Se Separan (Daddy Yankee)
2004: Reggaeton Ripiao (Grupo Aguakate ft. Don Chezina)
2004: Miralo y aceptalo (Funky, Ivan y AB)
2005: Stand Strong (Papa San)
2006: Dime Que Sera (R.K.M. & Ken-Y ft. Cruzito)
2006: La Revolucion Del Reggaeton (Dj Memo)
2006: De Que Vale (Gargolas ft. Cruzito)
2006: Si la ves (R.K.M. & Ken-Y ft. Cruzito)
2007: Me Matas (R.K.M. & Ken-Y)
2007: Me Matas remix (R.K.M. & Ken-Y ft. Daddy Yankee)
2007: Sueltate (R.K.M. & Ken-Y ft. Cruzito)
2007: Quedate con el (Nicky Jam)
2007: Oh Oh, ¿Porque Te Están Velando? (R.K.M. & Ken-Y)
2007: Suspenso (Jancy, Lennox) 
2008: Amor Escondido (Randy ft. Cruzito
2008: Bounce (Lito, Cruzito)
2008: Para Mi (Erre XI – Errevolution XI)
2009: Mas Remix (Nelly Furtado, Tony Dize)
2009: One in a Million (Tony Dize)
2009: One in a Million remix (Tony Dize ft. R.K.M. & Ken-Y, Cruzito)
2009: Durmiendo Relajada (Erre XI – Errevolution XI)
2009: Traicionera remix (Diamond Flow, Américo)
2010: Si no le contesto (Plan B)
2010: Hasta Abajo Don Omar
2010: Que me paso (Plan B)
2010: Es un secreto (Plan B)
2010: Mi amor es pobre (Tony Dize, R.K.M. & Ken-Y, Arcángel)
2010: Para Mi (Gerry Capo ft. Grupo Nota)
2010: Yo Quiero Un Pueblo Que Cante (R.K.M. & Ken-Y, Tony Dize, Plan B & Cruzito)
2010: Por amor a ti (Ken-Y)
2020: Mi Delirio remix (Anahí, Ken-Y)
2010: Como curar (Zion y Lennox)
2010: Momentos (Zion y Lennox)
2010: De una vez (Zion y Lennox)
2010: Soltera (Zion y Lennox, Alberto Stylee, J Balvin)
2010: Arriesgando mi inocencia (Zion y Lennox)
2010: Solos (Tony Dize – La Melodia Updated, Plan B, Don Omar)
2011: Vagabundo (Cruzito)
2011: Prefiero Morir (R.K.M. & Ken-Y)
2011: Goodbye (R.K.M. & Ken-Y)
2011: Te Doy una Rosa (R.K.M. & Ken-Y)
2011: Mas (R.K.M. & Ken-Y)
2011: Te Amor (R.K.M. & Ken-Y)
2011: De Rodillas (R.K.M. & Ken-Y)
2011: Prefiero morir remix (R.K.M. & Ken-Y)
2011: Forever (R.K.M. & Ken-Y)
2011: Desperate for your love (Ken-Y) 
2011: La Crema reggaeton version (Big Metra) 
2012: Habla Claro (Arcángel, Noztra)
2012: Pongan atencion (Farina)
2012: Descaradamente Bella (Farina)
2012: Soñar no cuesta nada (Farina)
2012: Money, money (Farina)
2013: Camaleón (Los Rakas ft. Frank Nino)
2014: Ménage à trois (J. Quiles)
2015: Al Limite de la Locura (Tony Dize – La Melodia Updated)
2015: De Que Vale pt. 2 (Cruzito)
2016: Amor de Locos (R.K.M. & Ken-Y, Natti Natasha)
2016: Te invito a volar (R.K.M. & Ken-Y)
2018: Amor Escondido (Cruzito)
2020: Wavy (Cruzito, Skilteck)

Awards

References

Stats of Myztiko's Singles on Billboard
Ascap 2012
 NYC Taste Makers June, 2019
 Listin Diario October 26, 2012
 Primera Hora January 26, 2016
 Ritmo Urbano November 11, 2014
 Sounds and Colours August 04, 2013
 El Nacional October 30, 2012
 Quinceanera October 26, 2012
 El Caribe October 26, 2012
Latin Billboard Awards Winners 2008
 Billboard Magazine January 27, 2007
 Billboard Magazine January 20, 2007
 Billboard Magazine February 3, 2007
 Billboard Magazine February 17, 2007
 Billboard Magazine February 24, 2007
 Billboard Magazine July 22, 2006
Solo Sabor – Artist Biography
http://www.montrealmirror.com/2005/061605/cover_music.html
https://www.latinurban.ca/feature.php?id=167
http://www.rfamilymusic.net/index.php/jportfolio/1-Productores-Djs-de-Reggaeton/119-Mystiko.html

Living people
Year of birth missing (living people)